Helena Winifred Carroll (13 November 1928 – 31 March 2013) was a veteran film, television and stage actress.

Early life 
Born to clothing designer Helena Reilly and Abbey Theatre playwright Paul Vincent Carroll, she was the youngest of three sisters. Her elder sisters were Theresa Elizabeth Perez (1924–2001), a classically trained musician and the producer/founder of the People's Pops Concerts in Phoenix, Arizona, and journalist Kathleen Moira Carroll (1927–2007).

Carroll attended Clerkhill Notre Dame High School, a Roman Catholic convent school in Dumbarton.

Stage career 
Carroll received her acting training at the Central School which later became the Webber Douglas Academy of Dramatic Art London, appearing in three plays in London's West End and a film, Midnight Episode, by age 20. She made her Broadway debut in Separate Tables by Terence Rattigan. She moved to the U.S. during the 1950s, touring and performing on Broadway and co-founded, with Dermot McNamara,  The Irish Players, a repertory theater company in Manhattan.

Helena split her stage work between Dublin, London and New York, appearing on Broadway in, among other productions the original production of Oliver! as Mrs. Sowerberry, as well as Pickwick, Design for Living, Waiting in the Wings, and the Elizabeth Taylor-Richard Burton revival of Private Lives (New York and Los Angeles). Her last stage performance was in 2007 at the age of 78.

Film and television
Carroll played the leading role of Nora, in a television production of her father's play, The White Steed (1959 Play of the Week Series), directed by Joe Gisterak. Gisterak directed a 1980 commissioned opera of her father's play, Beauty is Fled, as part of the "Children's Opera Series", which her sister,  Theresa Perez founded. The opera was performed at the Phoenix Symphony Hall.

Prompted by producer Al Simon and casting director Caro Jones, Carroll moved to Los Angeles in the late 1960s and appeared in numerous films and television programs, including the lively Aunt Kate in John Huston's Academy Award-nominated film The Dead, based on the short story by James Joyce. Other works in Hollywood included The Friends of Eddie Coyle starring Robert Mitchum, The Jerk, directed by Carl Reiner and starring Steve Martin, The Mambo Kings, the Warren Beatty remake of Love Affair, the 1979 NBC mini-series Backstairs at the White House, and such television programs as Kojak, General Hospital, The Edge of Night, Loving Couples, Laverne and Shirley, Murder She Wrote, and Married... With Children.

Death
Carroll resided in Los Angeles, and died in Marina del Rey, California from heart failure on 31 March 2013 at the age of 84. She is survived by a half brother, Brian Carroll; a niece, Helena Perez Reilly; and a great-nephew, Paul Vincent Reilly.

Filmography

References

External links

1928 births
2013 deaths
Actresses from Glasgow
Scottish film actresses
Scottish musical theatre actresses
Scottish stage actresses
Scottish television actresses
Scottish people of Irish descent
Scottish Roman Catholics
People educated at Notre Dame High School, Glasgow
Scottish emigrants to the United States